Frankie Rose (born 1979) is an American musician and songwriter. She was an original member of Crystal Stilts, Dum Dum Girls, Vivian Girls and Beverly.

Career
Formerly of bands Vivian Girls and Beverly, Frankie was the drummer for the acts Crystal Stilts and Dum Dum Girls. Rose released her first single "Thee Only One" on Slumberland Records in 2009 under Frankie Rose and the Outs and followed up in 2010 with a full-length album as Frankie Rose. Her second full-length album, Interstellar, was released in February 2012 and earned a "Best New Music" designation from Pitchfork.[2] Her third album titled Herein Wild was released by Fat Possum in 2013. She lives in Brooklyn, New York, and released her fourth album, Cage Tropical, in August 2017.

In 2017, Rose released a cover album of the Cure's Seventeen Seconds.

Discography

Albums
Vivian Girls S/T (IntheRed, 2008)
Frankie Rose and the Outs (Slumberland, 2010)
Interstellar (Slumberland, 2012)
Herein Wild (Fat Possum, 2013)
Careers (Kanine, 2014) – as Beverly
Cage Tropical (Slumberland/Grey, 2017)
Seventeen Seconds (Slumberland, 2019)
Love as Projection (Slumberland, 2023)

EPs
Night Swim, Slumberland, 2012

Singles
"Thee Only One", Slumberland, 2009
"Know Me", Slumberland, 2012

References

External links
Official website

Living people
American women drummers
American rock drummers
Fat Possum Records artists
1979 births
20th-century American drummers
20th-century American women musicians
21st-century American singers
21st-century American women singers
21st-century American drummers
Slumberland Records artists